Good Evening is a 1989 album by Marshall Crenshaw.  Although critically well-received, it failed to chart.

Crenshaw attributed the Traveling Wilburys' debut album as an influence for the album's sound. The album was Crenshaw's last for Warner Bros. Records and, due to his soured relationship with the label, he chose to fill the album with covers. He recalled, "I wasn't writing many songs back then. I didn't want to write any songs for the album, because I had very little faith and I couldn't get myself to make that kind of commitment to the record. I decided to save my energy."

The album's opening track, "You Should've Been There", has a longer intro on this album than on Rhino's compilation, This Is Easy: The Best of Marshall Crenshaw. The album includes the first commercial release of the Diane Warren song "Some Hearts", which became a hit in 2005 in a version by country singer Carrie Underwood. Crenshaw later described the experience of covering a Warren song as "strange."

Track listing

"You Should've Been There" (Leroy Preston, Marshall Crenshaw) – 3:52
"Valerie" (Richard Thompson) – 3:35
"She Hates to Go Home" (Leroy Preston, Marshall Crenshaw) – 4:46
"Someplace Where Love Can't Find Me" (John Hiatt) – 4:01
"Radio Girl" (Kurt Neumann, Marshall Crenshaw, Sam Llanas) – 4:04
"On the Run" (Marshall Crenshaw) – 3:14
"Live It Up" (Chris Jasper, Isley Brothers) – 3:36
"Some Hearts" (Diane Warren) – 4:21
"Whatever Way the Wind Blows" (Marshall Crenshaw) – 3:25
"Let Her Dance" (Bobby Fuller)  – 2:55

Personnel
Marshall Crenshaw - vocals, guitar
Bob Marlette - keyboards, bass, drums
Sonny Landreth - slide guitar
David Lindley - slide guitar, fiddle, mandolin
Graham Maby - bass
Steve Conn - keyboards
Kenny Aronoff - drums, percussion
James Burton - guitar on "Whatever Way the Wind Blows" 
Eric Pressley - bass on "Whatever Way the Wind Blows"
J.D. Maness - steel guitar on "Whatever Way the Wind Blows"
The Bodeans, Robert Crenshaw, Patti McCarron, Syd Straw - background vocals

References 

1989 albums
Marshall Crenshaw albums
Albums produced by David Kershenbaum
Warner Records albums